Fortunato Yambao (born October 16, 1912 in Masantol, Pampanga, Philippine Islands; died June 23, 1970 in Cavite, Philippines) was a Filipino basketball player who competed in the 1936 Summer Olympics.

References

External links
 

1912 births
1970 deaths
Basketball players from Pampanga
Olympic basketball players of the Philippines
Basketball players at the 1936 Summer Olympics
Philippines men's national basketball team players
Filipino men's basketball players